, better known by his pen name , is a Japanese manga artist. He is mostly known for being the author of Futaba-Kun Change!, Morumo 1/10 and Yuu and Mii.

Aro worked as an assistant to manga artist Osamu Akimoto. He admitted that Futaba-kun Change! was created to be his version of Ranma ½ by Rumiko Takahashi, just as Yuu & Mi was his version of Takahashi's Maison Ikkoku. Aro makes guest appearances in his own comics, drawing himself as an alligator wearing glasses.

Works
Yuu and Mii (1986–1989, serialized in Monthly Shōnen Jump, Shueisha)
Morumo 1/10 (1986–1987, serialized in Gekkan Shōnen Captain, Tokuma Shoten)
Futaba-Kun Change! (1991–1997, serialized in Monthly Shōnen Jump, Shueisha)
Hunter Cats (1993–1996, serialized in Shōnen Captain, Tokuma Shoten)
Muteki Eiyuu Esugaiyaa (1994, Hakusensha)
Kagaku no Nyotaimori (2002, Futabasha)
Mikoto Nikki (2002, Shueisha)
Meitantei Amikasa Kurisu!! (2004, Bunkasha)
Boku no Shachōsama (2006-ongoing, serialized in  Manga Time Jumbo, Houbunsha)
Momoiro Bukken (1999–2002, serialized in Kyun, Cosmic International)

References

External links

1959 births
Manga artists from Tokyo
Living people